Donald F. Currivan (March 6, 1920 – May 16, 1956) was an American football end. He was born and raised in Mansfield, Massachusetts and graduated from Mansfield High School in 1938. He then attended and graduated from Boston College in 1942. Fleet of foot and sure of hand, this All-American end's pass- catching and running abilities were key factors in boosting the Eagles to national rankings and berths in the 1941 Sugar Bowl and 1943 Orange Bowl. A stalwart defensive end as well, he was a major and versatile contributor to this great era of Boston College gridiron success.

He played seven seasons in the National Football League (NFL) for the Chicago Cardinals (1943), the Boston Yanks (1945–1948), and the Los Angeles Rams (1948–1949). Currivan also played for "Card-Pitt" in 1944, a team that was the result of a temporary merger between the Cardinals and the Pittsburgh Steelers. The teams' merger was result of the manning shortages experienced league-wide due to World War II. 

Currivan married Catherine (Rockett) Currivan in 1946. He had two children, John Joseph in 1948 and Nancy Anne, in 1953. He died suddenly on May 16, 1956 of a cerebral hemorrhage while playing golf at Oyster Harbors Golf Club in Osterville, Massachusetts at age 36.

Due to his outstanding athletic abilities he was inducted into the Boston College Varsity Club Athletic Hall of Fame 14 years after his death in 1970.

References

External links
 

1920 births
1956 deaths
American football ends
Boston College Eagles football players
Boston Yanks players
Card-Pitt players
Chicago Cardinals players
Los Angeles Rams players
People from Mansfield, Massachusetts
Players of American football from Massachusetts